Vlodrop-station (Limburgish and town dialect: Vlórp-Statie) is a hamlet in the Dutch province of Limburg.

The hamlet is named after the railway station of Vlodrop, which was located on the Iron Rhine connection between Antwerp, Belgium, and locations in Germany.  The location was chosen because the Belgian owners of the railway line could get free land there, and because of the proximity to the border meant that customs officers had extra powers. The station was bombed in 1944, and never rebuilt.

References

Populated places in Limburg (Netherlands)
Roerdalen